Sir Ti-liang Yang,  (born 30 June 1929) is a retired senior Hong Kong judge. He was the Chief Justice of Hong Kong from 1988–1996, the only ethnic Chinese person to hold this office during British colonial rule.

He was a candidate in the 1996 Hong Kong Chief Executive election, where he lost to his opponent Tung Chee-Hwa. After the transfer of the sovereignty of Hong Kong, he was appointed a non-official member of the Executive Council by Tung and retired in 2002. In retirement, he mainly focuses on writing and teaching English. In September 2003, he became the host of a RTHK radio programme, Yang Ti-liang Mail Box, teaching English grammar.

Early life 
Yang was born in Shanghai on 30 June 1929. He attended St. John's Middle School (same foundation as St. John's University) in his early years and read law in the Comparative Law School of China in Soochow University (Suzhou) from 1946–49. Due to the Chinese Civil War, he moved very briefly to Hong Kong before graduating, where he stayed at St. John's Hall in 1949. Then he moved to England to read law at University College London, where he graduated with an LLB with honours in 1953. In 1954, he was called to the bar with honours at Gray's Inn. After studying in England, Yang returned to Hong Kong in 1955.

Judicial career
In June 1956, Yang was offered a post as magistrate, which he accepted, and, in 1963, he was promoted to senior magistrate. Yang was acting District Judge from 1964 to 1968. During that period, he was chairman of the Kowloon Disturbances Claims Assessment Board and following the 1967 Leftist Riots, he also presided over the Compensation Board. In 1968, he was appointed District Judge of the Victoria District Court and was made a member of the Chinese Language Committee and president of the Legal Sub-Committee in 1970. Yang was, for a brief period in 1971, acting Puisne Judge.

In 1972, he was appointed Commissioner of Inquiry into the Rainstorm Disasters. On 17 February 1975, he presided over the watershed corruption trial of Peter Fitzroy Godber, a former Kowloon Deputy District Commissioner of the Royal Hong Kong Police Force. Yang sentenced him to four years' imprisonment after a six-day trial.  That same year, Yang was promoted to Judge of the High Court of Justice of the Supreme Court of Hong Kong. In 1976, he chaired the Commission of Inquiry into the Leung Wing-sang case in which a station sergeant, Lau Cheong-wah, allegedly induced Leung with HK$10,000 to confess to wounding another person. In 1980, Yang was chairman of the Commission of Inquiry into the apparent suicide of Inspector John MacLennan.

Yang was appointed a Justice of Appeal in 1981 and, six year later, Vice-President. In March 1988, Yang was appointed Chief Justice of Hong Kong (the then chief judge of the Court of Appeal) following recommendation of the Governor Sir David Wilson. This was the first time an ethnic Chinese had held this office. Prior to the appointment, he also received a knighthood from Queen Elizabeth II in the New Year Honours List. According to customary practice, Chief Justices of Hong Kong would also become Chief Justice of Brunei Darussalam. Yang's predecessor, however, Sir Denys Tudor Emil Roberts, continued to serve as Chief Justice of Brunei Darussalam after his retirement. Sir TL was instead appointed as president of the Court of Appeal of Brunei on 24 May 1988.

Chief Executive election
In 1996, Yang tendered his resignation to then governor Chris Patten in order to clear the way for his candidacy in the first ever Chief Executive election. In addition, he renounced his British citizenship and wrote a letter to Queen Elizabeth II to give up his knighthood. Before the election, he organised a series of campaigns, including visiting public housing estates, and travelled on the Mass Transit Railway subway system for the first time in his life. On 11 December 1996, the small-circle Election Committee selected Tung Chee Hwa, a shipping magnate, over Yang to be Chief Executive. The vote was 320 to 42.

Yang was appointed a Non-Official Member of the Executive Council by Tung soon after the establishment of the Hong Kong Special Administrative Region. During his tenure in the Council, he was chairman of the Exchange Fund Investment Ltd from 1998 to 2002 and was responsible to the management of the Tracker Fund of Hong Kong. From 1999 to 2004, he was also chairman of the Independent Commission Against Corruption Complaints Committee.

Public service
From 1981 to 1984, Yang was chairman of the University and Polytechnic Grants Committee. From 1985 to 2001, he was chairman of the University of Hong Kong Council. He was also Pro-Chancellor of the University of Hong Kong from 1994 to 2001. In 2000, during his Pro-Chancellorship, he was designated by the university to investigate the Public Opinion Programme Disputes.

In 1988, he was elected an Honorary Bencher of Gray's Inn. He served as President of the Bentham Club at University College London in 1991. From 1998 to 2012, he was chairman of the Hong Kong Red Cross; in June 2012, he assumed the honorary position of President.

After retiring from the Executive Council in 2002, Yang spent much of his time teaching English grammar and etiquette. In September 2003, he hosted a Radio Television Hong Kong radio programme, Yang Ti-liang Mail Box, teaching English grammar and answering questions on his website. He has been honorary professor of Chinese at the University of Hong Kong since 1998. In 2005, he was appointed honorary professor and chairman of the Executive Committee of the School of Law by the Chinese University of Hong Kong. In 2006, he was made honorary professor of Social Sciences at the Open University of Hong Kong.

Translated works
Yang has translated Chinese classics into English, including:
General Yue Fei, 1995
The Peach Blossom Fan, 1998
Officialdom Unmasked, 2001

Honours
He was knighted in 1988. He was appointed a Justice of Peace from 1 July 1998 to 2012. He was awarded the Grand Bauhinia Medal by the Government of Hong Kong Special Administrative Region in 1999 to acknowledge his contribution to justice and higher education in Hong Kong.

Honorary degrees
Hon. LLD, Chinese University of Hong Kong, 1984
Hon. DLitt, University of Hong Kong, 1991
Hon. LLD, Hong Kong Polytechnic, 1992

Fellows
University College London, 1989
Chartered Institute of Arbitrators, 1990

See also
Chief Justice of the Supreme Court of Hong Kong
Tung Chee Hwa

References

Additional sources

English materials

Former Chief Justice warns not to let language deteriorate, Pensioners' Corner, Civil Service Newsletter Editorial Board, retrieved on 1 September
The Hon. Sir Ti Liang Yang, GBM, JP Curriculum Vitae, Hong Kong Red Cross, 2005
Information Paper for the Joint Meeting of the Panel on Security and Panel on Health Services to be held on 29 April 2003, Hong Kong Legislative Council, retrieved on 1 September 2007
HISTORY, Supreme Court of Brunei Darussalam, retrieved on 1 September 2007
American Journal of Sociology, Vol. 116, No. 3 (Nov 2010) pp. 1046–1052 by Barbara Celarent

Chinese materials

得失之間　楊鐵樑, 壹週刊時事專訪, 7 August 2003
楊鐵樑簡介, 楊鐵樑留言信箱, RTHK, retrieved on 1 September 2007
Taigu Jituan Zaijiu Zhongguo Shanghai Renmin Chuban She 1991

External links
 Sir TL's Website by RTHK (in Chinese)
 CV of Sir TL Yang, Hong Kong Red Cross
 Yang, Sir Ti-liang, address from HKU

1929 births
Living people
Hong Kong judges
Knights Bachelor
Recipients of the Grand Bauhinia Medal
Chief Justices of the Supreme Court of Hong Kong
British Hong Kong judges
Politicians from Shanghai
Hong Kong radio presenters
Alumni of University College London
Alumni of St. John's Hall, University of Hong Kong
Alumni of the School of Advanced Study
Members of Gray's Inn
Members of the Executive Council of Hong Kong
British judges on the courts of Brunei
Hong Kong Basic Law Consultative Committee members